Obukhovo is a rural locality (a village) in Semyonkovskoye  Rural Settlement, Vologodsky District, Vologda Oblast, Russia. The population was 28 as of 2002.

Geography 
The distance to Vologda is 17 km, to Semyonkovo is 9 km. Luchnikovo is the nearest rural locality.

References 

Rural localities in Vologodsky District